Bessonovsky (masculine), Bessonovskaya (feminine), or Bessonovskoye (neuter) may refer to:
Bessonovsky District, a district of Penza Oblast, Russia
Bessonovsky (rural locality) (Bessonovskoye, Bessonovskaya), name of several rural localities in Russia